Dominick Burke or Bourke (died 8 December 1747) was an Irish politician from County Galway.

He represented the borough of Galway in the Irish House of Commons from 1735 to his death. He was also Mayor of Galway in 1735 and 1737 and Recorder of the town from 1739 to 1747.

His sons included Dominick, who married Margaret, widow of Francis Annesley of Ballysax and daughter and heiress of Edward Eyre of Galway, but had no issue by her, and Bingham, a captain in the Army. His daughter Sarah married George Brabazon of New Park and was the mother of Sir Anthony Brabazon, 1st Baronet.

References
 James Hardiman, The History of the Town and County of the Town of Galway (Dublin, 1820)

1747 deaths
Mayors of Galway
Irish MPs 1727–1760
Politicians from County Galway
Year of birth unknown
Members of the Parliament of Ireland (pre-1801) for County Galway constituencies